The following is a listing of R.E.M. tours.

1981

Rapid.Eye.Movement.Tour.1981

R.E.M. traveled extensively, mostly around the Deep South, during their first few years of being a unit. Their first real, albeit relatively local, tour took place in 1981. Mistakenly nicknamed "Rapid.Eye.Movement.Tour.1981" by the band's manager at the time, Jefferson Holt, the tour was arranged by Bill Berry, and its main aim was to help raise the necessary funds to keep the band operating. The tour was in support of their "Radio Free Europe" single, which was to be released on David Hibbert's Hib-Tone label in July 1981.

The tour began on March 26, 1981 at K. O. Jam's in Murfreesboro, Tennessee.

Setlist 
The typical setlist for the tour consisted of:

 "Rave On!" (Sonny West cover)
 "Burning Down"
 "A Girl Like You" (The Young Rascals cover)
 "Get on Their Way"
 "There She Goes Again" (The Velvet Underground cover)
 "Pretty Persuasion"
 "Body Count"
 "Narrator"
 "Hey Hey Nadine"
 "Shaking Through"
 "Just a Touch"
 "(Don't Go Back to) Rockville"
 "Dangerous Times"
 "Sitting Still"
 "All the Right Friends"
 "Radio Free Europe"
 "Little Girl"
 "Permanent Vacation"
 "Mystery to Me"
 "Gardening at Night"
 "Windout"
 "I Can't Control Myself" (The Troggs cover)
 "Wait"
 "Baby I"
 "Scheherazade" (Nikolai Rimsky-Koraskov cover)
 "Lisa Says" (The Velvet Underground cover)
 "9-9"
 "White Tornado"

1982

Chronic Town Tour

In August, the band's first true national tour, in support of Chronic Town, began in San Diego, California. It finished in Florida four months later.

Setlist 
The typical setlist for the tour consisted of:

 "Gardening at Night"
 "Pilgrimage"
 "9-9"
 "Wolves, Lower"
 "Romance"
 "Moral Kiosk"
 "Sitting Still"
 "1,000,000"
 "Pretty Persuasion"
 "Catapult"
 "Radio Free Europe"
 "Ages of You"
 "West of the Fields"
 "White Tornado"
 "Carnival of Sorts (Boxcars)"

1983

Murmur Tour

A tour in support of Murmur got underway in March. The band made their first live television appearance during the tour, on Late Night with David Letterman on October 6. The tour concluded in Europe in late November.

Setlist
This set list is representative of the performance in Rouen, France. It does not represent all concerts for the duration of the tour.

"Gardening at Night"
"9-9"
"Catapult"
"Letter Never Sent"
"Pilgrimage"
"7 Chinese Bros."
"Talk About the Passion"
"So. Central Rain (I'm Sorry)"
"Sitting Still"
"Harborcoat"
"Moral Kiosk"
"Little America"
"Second Guessing"
"Radio Free Europe"
"Pale Blue Eyes"
"Camera"
"1,000,000"
"Carnival of Sorts (Box Cars)"
"Wolves, Lower"
The typical setlist for the tour consisted of:

 "Moral Kiosk"
 "Pilgrimage"
 "Laughing"
 "Catapult"
 "Talk About the Passion"
 "7 Chinese Bros."
 "Sitting Still"
 "Wolves, Lower"
 "Gardening at Night"
 "Harborcoat"
 "9-9"
 "Pretty Persuasion"
 "Windout"
 "Just a Touch"
 "West of the Fields"
 "Radio Free Europe"
 "1,000,000"
 "We Walk"
 "Carnival of Sorts (Boxcars)"

Tour dates

1984

Little America Tour

R.E.M. returned to Europe in April 1984, this time in support of their second studio album, Reckoning, with a tour titled the "Little America tour" ("Little America" being a track on the album). They tour their homeland between June and November, before visiting Asia for the first time in mid-November. This was followed with a few more shows in the UK and Norway during late November and early January 1985.

Setlist
This set list is representative of the performance in Rouen, France. It does not represent all concerts for the duration of the tour.

"Radio Free Europe"
"Harborcoat"
"Pilgrimage"
"Driver 8"
"Talk About the Passion"
"Hyena"
"7 Chinese Bros."
"So. Central Rain (I'm Sorry)"
"Letter Never Sent"
"Auctioneer (Another Engine)"
"Gardening at Night"
"9-9"
"Windout"
"Old Man Kensey"
"Pretty Persuasion"
"Little America"
"Femme Fatale"
"Riders in the Sky"
"(Don't Go Back To) Rockville"
"Wolves, Lower"
"Moon River"
"Wendell Gee"
"See No Evil"
"Just a Touch"
The typical setlist for the tour consisted of:

 "Second Guessing"
 "Harborcoat"
 "Pilgrimage"
 "Hyena"
 "7 Chinese Bros."
 "Letter Never Sent"
 "So. Central Rain"
 "Talk About the Passion"
 "Driver 8"
 "Sitting Still"
 "Gardening at Night"
 "Radio Free Europe"
 "9-9"
 "Windout"
 "Old Man Kensey"
 "Pretty Persuasion"
 "Just a Touch"
 "Little America"
 "Pale Blue Eyes" (The Velvet Underground cover)
 "Femme Fatale" (The Velvet Underground cover)
 "(Don't Go Back to) Rockville"
 "1,000,000"
 "Moon River" (Henry Mancini cover)
 "We Walk"
 "Carnival of Sorts (Boxcars)"

Tour dates

Cancellations and rescheduled shows

1985

Reconstruction Tour

A "Pre-Construction" tour in April and May took the band around several eastern states. After the release of Fables of the Reconstruction in June, the band traveled to Europe. The following month, they returned to North America for a two-month tour. The "Reconstruction I" tour began in Oregon in July and ended in New Jersey in August.

October's "Reconstruction II" tour took the band back to Europe, beginning in the Netherlands and ending in Scotland.

In November, "Reconstruction III" commenced in Colorado.

Setlist 
The typical setlist for the tour consisted of:

 "Feeling Gravity's Pull"
 "Green Grow the Rushes"
 "Maps and Legends"
 "Harborcoat"
 "Hyena"
 "Driver 8"
 "Fall on Me"
 "Good Advices"
 "Sitting Still"
 "So. Central Rain"
 "Have You Ever Seen the Rain?" (Creedence Clearwater Revival cover)
 "Can't Get There From Here"
 "7 Chinese Bros."
 "Auctioneer"
 "Old Man Kensey"
 "Pretty Persuasion"
 "Life and How to Live It"
 "Little America"
 "Talk About the Passion"
"Second Guessing"
 "Gardening at Night"
"(Don't Go Back to) Rockville"
 "Toys In the Attic" (Aerosmith cover)
 "Tired of Singing Trouble"
 "Theme From Two Steps Onward"
 "See No Evil" (Television cover)

1986

Pageantry Tour

"Pageantry Tour", in support of Lifes Rich Pageant.

Setlist 
The typical setlist for the tour consisted of:

 "These Days"
 "Harborcoat"
 "Hyena"
 "Sitting Still"
 "The One I Love"
 "Shaking Through"
 "Feeling Gravity's Pull"
 "The Flowers of Guatemala"
 "Maps and Legends"
 "Driver 8"
 "I Believe"
 "Swan Swan H"
 "7 Chinese Bros."
 "Superman" (The Clique cover)
 "Can't Get There From Here"
 "Old Man Kensey"
 "Pretty Persuasion"
 "Auctioneer"
 "Cuyahoga"
 "Fall on Me"
 "Little America"
 "Just a Touch"
 "Strange"  (Wire cover)
 "Begin the Begin"
 "Oddfellows Local 151"
 "Funtime" (Iggy Pop cover)
 "So. Central Rain"

1987

Work Tour

"Work Tour", in support of the album Document. R.E.M. did not perform any shows throughout the following year, and signed to Warner Bros. for the release of their sixth studio album, Green. R.E.M. remained with Warner Bros. until their breakup in 2011.

Setlist 
The typical setlist for the tour consisted of:

 "Finest Worksong"
 "These Days"
 "Welcome to the Occupation"
 "Exhuming McCarthy"
 "Orange Crush"
 "Feeling Gravity's Pull"
 "Disturbance at the Heron House"
 "King of Birds"
 "I Believe"
 "Cuyahoga"
 "Driver 8"
 "Sitting Still"
 "Superman" (The Clique cover)
 "Oddfellows Local 151"
 "Pretty Persuasion"
 "It's the End of the World as We Know It"
 "Auctioneer"
 "Begin the Begin"
 "The Flowers of Guatemala"
 "Fall on Me"
 "Just a Touch"
 "Strange" (Wire cover)
 "The One I Love"
 "Pop Song '89"
 "See No Evil" (Television cover)
 "Harpers" (Hugo Largo cover)
 "Crazy" (Pylon cover)

1989

Green Tour

R.E.M.'s first major tour, as well as their biggest most visually developed tour to date, featured back-projections and art films playing on the stage during the band's shows.  The tour featured Peter Holsapple of the dB's as an auxiliary musician on guitar, keys and vocals as needed.  Subsequent tours would further feature backing musicians assuming instrumental roles, especially after Bill Berry's departure in 1997.

The final show of the tour, at the Fox Theatre in Atlanta, featured the band performing their first full-length album, Murmur in order, from start to finish, followed by Green in order, from start to finish. The night was concluded by an encore set performed by Mike & the Melons with Michael Stipe fronting the road crew. It marked the only live performance of "The Wrong Child", and one of the few live performances of "Hairshirt".

A concert video called Tourfilm is a compilation of footage from various locations on these tours.

R.E.M. would not tour again until 1995, following the release of Monster the previous year.

The typical setlist consisted of:

 "Pop Song '89"
 "Welcome to the Occupation"
 "Exhuming McCarthy"
 "The One I Love"
 "Turn You Inside Out"
 "Disturbance at the Heron House"
 "Orange Crush"
 "Feeling Gravity's Pull"
 "Belong"
 "Sitting Still"
 "World Leader Pretend"
 "These Days"
 "Stand"
 "Pretty Persuasion"
 "I Believe"
 "Get Up"
 "Begin the Begin"
 "Auctioneer"
 "It's The End of the World as We Know It"
 "Fall on Me"
 "King of Birds"
 "Crazy" (Pylon cover)
 "You Are the Everything"
 "Finest Worksong"
 "Perfect Circle"
 "Dark Globe" (Syd Barrett cover)
 "Harpers" (Hugo Largo cover)
 "See No Evil" (Television cover)
 "After Hours" (The Velvet Underground cover)

1995

Monster Tour ("Aneurysm '95 Tour")

After refusing to tour in support of their two previous releases, Out of Time and Automatic for the People, the band agreed to tour in support of Monster. The tour was critically and commercially successful, though a handful of shows were either cancelled or postponed due to health problems associated with the band members.

The concert video Road Movie is a compilation of footage taken from the final three nights of the tour, in Atlanta.

New Adventures in Hi-Fi, the band's tenth studio album, was released in 1996 without a supporting tour, though a handful of material was performed during this tour, either during soundcheck or the actual show. Eight-track recorders were brought to capture its shows, and used the recordings as the base elements for that album.

This was the final tour to feature Bill Berry, though he briefly reunited with them during a show in 2003. This was also the first tour to feature involvement from Seattle-based multi-instrumentalist Scott McCaughey, who remained active with the group on recordings of albums from New Adventures in Hi-Fi to Collapse Into Now, as well as subsequent tours.

1998/1999
After initially stating they would not tour behind this year's Up, the band changed their mind. A small television-and-radio tour around North America and Europe occurred between October and December. A larger, six-month tour around the same continents began in February in Europe the following year. The North American leg began in August.

"Airportman" was performed at a benefit show before the promo tour commenced in 1998, but not during any tours throughout the band's career. "You're In the Air" and "Diminished" (despite the "I'm Not Over You" coda being performed) were never performed live either.

Regular additional tour musicians were Joey Waronker (drums), Ken Stringfellow (keyboards) and Scott McCaughey (guitars).

2001
Supporting Reveal, R.E.M. undertook a small tour that took in New York City, Toronto, Japan, Australia and California.

Although "Saturn Return" was never performed live, Michael Stipe performed the song entirely himself during a show at Carnegie Hall in March 2011.

2003
A tour in support of the band's Warner Bros. compilation In Time took place in Europe between June and August, then in North America between August and October.

The concert video Perfect Square was taken from footage captured from a show in Wiesbaden, Germany, on this tour.

At a concert in Raleigh, North Carolina, Berry made a surprise appearance, performing backing vocals on "Radio Free Europe". He then sat behind the drum kit for a performance of the early R.E.M. song "Permanent Vacation", marking his first performance with the band since his retirement, though he still refused to rejoin the group regardless.

This was the first tour to feature Bill Rieflin, who later recorded the next three albums released from the band and performed with the group on tours supporting two of those three album releases.

2004/2005
A promo tour for Around the Sun began in Europe in September. Prior to the release of the album, the band partook in the political "Vote for Change" tour, which included shows in Pennsylvania, Ohio, Michigan, Florida and Washington, D.C.

A post-album tour commenced in October in North America.

A European tour began in Europe in 2005, then extended to South Africa, Japan, Hong Kong, Australia and New Zealand. The final leg of the tour took the band back to Europe.

A concert CD/DVD featuring footage from the final shows of this tour in Dublin titled R.E.M. Live was released in 2007.

Around the Sun was a commercial and critical failure, and band members later expressed disappointment in the album after the tour ended. A majority of material from Around the Sun was largely absent in their subsequent tour.

Accelerate Tour

R.E.M.'s final tour was the "Accelerate Tour", which took place between March and November 2008.

In 2007, before the release of Accelerate and the supporting tour behind it in 2008, R.E.M. held five night "rehearsals" in front of a live audience at Olympia Theatre, Dublin to test out new material from Accelerate and to revisit and perform old favorites, many of which hadn't been played live in nearly two decades. The resulting live album and DVD, Live at The Olympia, was released in 2009.

Accelerate was met with much critical enthusiasm, especially from fans of their back catalog who praised the "back-to-basics" direction that was undertaken with the album. Given the lukewarm reception of their previous album in comparison, the band ignored everything from Around the Sun during a majority of shows during the tour.

R.E.M. disbanded in September 2011 and did not perform any shows after the conclusion of this tour. Their final Collapse into Now release was never performed live, though Michael Stipe did a solo performance of "Every Day Is Yours to Win" at Carnegie Hall in March 2011.

Set list
This set list is representative of the performance in Mexico City and does not represent all concerts for the duration of the tour.

"Living Well Is the Best Revenge"
"I Took Your Name"
"What's the Frequency, Kenneth?"
"Fall on Me"
"Drive"
"Man-Sized Wreath"
"Ignoreland"
"Disturbance at the Heron House"
"Hollow Man"
"Imitation of Life"
"Electrolite"
"The Great Beyond"
"Everybody Hurts"
"The One I Love"
"Find the River"
"Let Me In"
"Bad Day"
"Horse to Water"
"Orange Crush"
"It's the End of the World as We Know It (And I Feel Fine)"
"Supernatural Superserious"
"Losing My Religion"
"I Believe"
"Country Feedback"
"Life and How to Live It"
"Man on the Moon"

Opening acts

The National and Modest Mouse (North America, excluding festivals)
Editors (Europe, excluding festivals)
The Duke Spirit (Prague)
Elbow (Stuttgart – Würzburg)
Guillemots (United Kingdom)
The Disciplines (Oslo – Helsinki)
We Are Scientists (Tallinn – Madrid)
C：Real (Athens)

Gabriella Cilmi (Athens)
Kaiser Chiefs (Athens)
Old 97's (Grand Prairie)
Nenhum de Nós (Porto Alegre)
Fernando Magalhães (Rio de Janeiro)
Wilson Sidereal (São Paulo)
Los Concorde (Mexico City)

Shows

Live releases
Videos and DVDs
Tourfilm (1990)
Road Movie (1996)
Perfect Square (2004)
R.E.M. Live (2007)
Live at The Olympia (This Is Not a Show) (2009)
R.E.M. Live from Austin, Texas
REMTV (2014)

CDs and Digital Releases
Vancouver Rehearsal Tapes (2003)
R.E.M. Live (2007)
Live from London (2008)
Live at Larry's Hide-Away (Murmur 2008 Deluxe Edition bonus disc)
Live at the Aragon Ballroom (Reckoning 2009 Deluxe Edition bonus disc)
Live at The Olympia (2009)
Unplugged: The Complete 1991 and 2001 Sessions (2014)
R.E.M. at the BBC (2018)

This list includes only official releases made up exclusively and entirely of live performances. Various other live performances by R.E.M. can be found as B-sides, compilation tracks, bonus tracks, promotional EPs, bootlegs, etc.

References

Lists of concert tours